The Van Norman Dams, also known as the San Fernando Dams, were the terminus of the Los Angeles Aqueduct, supplying about 80 percent of Los Angeles' water, until their damage in the 1971 San Fernando earthquake and were subsequently decommissioned due to the inherent instability of the site and their location directly above heavily populated areas.

Construction 
In 1922, the dam was raised  with rolled fill.

The Lower Van Norman Dam was constructed with hydraulic and rolled fill. The last addition was made in 1929–30.

1971 San Fernando earthquake 

The 1971 San Fernando earthquake significantly damaged the dams, resulting in evacuation of thousands of people from the San Fernando Valley immediately below. 80,000 were evacuated for three days. Later, it was estimated that a dam failure could have killed 123,400.

Upper Van Norman dam 
The Upper Van Norman reservoir was operating at about one-third capacity at the time of the earthquake. The quake lowered dam height  and displaced the dam laterally .

Lower Van Norman dam 
This failure was predominantly due to liquefaction of the hydraulic fill. This rate was limited by earthquake damage to the outlet lines and drainage towers.

Aftermath 

Reconstruction was proposed, but abandoned after geologic evaluation showed the inherent instability of the dams' foundations.

As a replacement, the Los Angeles Dam was constructed between the original Lower and Upper Van Norman Dam structures in a more stable location. During the 1994 Northridge earthquake, the Lower Van Norman reservoir area was again severely damaged, but as then it was in use only as a holding basin, the consequences were minor.

Lessons learned 
The near failure of the Lower Van Norman Dam brought about major changes in the way public agencies and engineers viewed seismic safety, particularly regarding embankments of fine sands and silts and numeric dynamic analysis of dams. Also, it resulted in many mandated dam safety reassessments.

See also 
 List of national monuments of the United States
 List of dams and reservoirs in California
 Dam failure
 Baldwin Hills Reservoir
 St. Francis Dam

References

External links 

 
 

Dam failures in the United States
Dams in Los Angeles County, California
History of Los Angeles
History of Los Angeles County, California
Los Angeles Aqueduct
Reservoirs in California
Earthquake and seismic risk mitigation
Dams completed in 1921
San Fernando Valley
1971 in Los Angeles
1971 in California
1971 earthquakes
History of the San Fernando Valley
Geology of Los Angeles County, California